Porpolomopsis calyptriformis is a species of agaric (gilled mushroom) in the family Hygrophoraceae. It has been given the recommended English name of Pink Waxcap. The species has a European distribution, occurring mainly in agriculturally unimproved grassland. Threats to its habitat have resulted in the species being assessed as globally "vulnerable" on the IUCN Red List of Threatened Species. A similar but as yet unnamed species occurs in North America.

Taxonomy
The species was first described in 1838 by the Rev. Miles Joseph Berkeley as Agaricus calyptraeformis (so spelt), based on specimens he collected locally in England. In 1889, Swiss mycologist Victor Fayod moved it to the genus Hygrocybe. The specific epithet comes from Greek καλὐπτρα (= a woman's veil) + Latin forma (= shape), hence "veil-shaped".

In 2008, Bresinsky proposed the genus Porpolomopsis to accommodate the species. Recent molecular research, based on cladistic analysis of DNA sequences, found that Porpolomopsis calyptriformis does not belong in Hygrocybe sensu stricto and confirmed its removal to the genus Porpolomopsis.

Description
Basidiocarps are agaricoid, up to 125mm (5 in) tall, the cap narrowly conical at first, retaining an acute umbo when expanded, up to 75mm (3 in) across, often splitting when expanded, the margins turning upwards. The cap surface is smooth to fibrillose, slightly shiny or greasy, pale rose-pink to lilac-pink (rarely white). The lamellae (gills) are widely spaced, waxy, cap-coloured or whiter. The stipe (stem) is smooth, white to pale cap-coloured, lacking a ring. The spore print is white, the spores (under a microscope) smooth, inamyloid, ellipsoid, c. 6.5 to 8.0 by 4.5 to 5.5μm.

The species can normally be distinguished in the field, thanks to its shape and colour. No other European waxcap is pink with a pointed cap.

Distribution and habitat
The Pink Waxcap is widespread but generally rare throughout Europe, with its "stronghold" in the United Kingdom where it is not uncommon. Like other waxcaps, it occurs in old, agriculturally unimproved, short-sward grassland (pastures and lawns). The species has been reported from North America, but specimens that have been DNA-sequenced are not the same as the European P. calyptriformis.

Recent research suggests waxcaps are neither mycorrhizal nor saprotrophic but may be associated with mosses.

Conservation
Porpolomopsis calyptriformis is typical of waxcap grasslands, a declining habitat due to changing agricultural practices. As a result, the species is of global conservation concern and is listed as "vulnerable" on the IUCN Red List of Threatened Species. It is also one of 33 larger fungi proposed for international protection under the Bern Convention. Porpolomopsis calyptriformis also appears on the official or provisional national red lists of threatened fungi in several European countries, including Austria, Bulgaria, the Czech Republic, Denmark, France, Germany (Bavaria), Hungary, Italy, Poland, Slovakia, Spain, and Switzerland.

References

Fungi of Europe
Fungi described in 1838
Hygrophoraceae
Taxa named by Miles Joseph Berkeley